Jean'ne Marie Shreeve (born 1933) is an American chemist known for her studies of fluorine compounds and explosives. She has held her namesake professorship at the University of Idaho since 2004.

Early life and education 
Born in Deer Lodge, Montana in 1933, Jean'ne Shreeve was the second of two children to Mary-Frances and Charles W. Shreeve. She was named for the popular 1928 song "Jeannine, I Dream of Lilac Time". Her father worked for the Northern Pacific Railway and her mother was a teacher, though she spent much of Jean'ne's childhood unemployed, her job a casualty of the Great Depression and the idea that families only needed one adult breadwinner. Mary-Frances later worked as a public school teacher for 40 years. Jean'ne Shreeve had a close bond with her brother William, 22 months older.

She attended public schools in Montana for her primary and secondary education, graduating from Thompson Falls High School and earning a full scholarship to what was then Montana State University, now the University of Montana. She worked in the university's library and chemistry department, and participated in intramural sports, band, and a sorority. Shreeve graduated in 1953 with a bachelor's degree in chemistry, then worked for a year at Missoula County High School as a mathematics teacher. She went on to obtain her master's degree in analytical chemistry from the University of Minnesota  in 1956 and her Ph.D. in inorganic chemistry from the University of Washington in 1961. At the University of Washington, she worked with fluorine chemist George Cady, sparking her interest in the field.

Career and research 
After earning her Ph.D. in 1961, Shreeve took a post as assistant professor of chemistry at the University of Idaho, where she has remained for her entire career, bar short stints as a visiting professor at various institutions, including the University of Cambridge. Her time at Cambridge was sponsored by the National Science Foundation Ramsey Fellowship. She was promoted to full professor at the University of Idaho in 1967, department head of chemistry in 1973, and vice president in 1987.

At the beginning of her career at Idaho, Shreeve worked with Malcolm Renfrew, who mentored her as she grew a laboratory and began to publish her work. While at Cambridge, she was mentored by Harry Emeléus, a renowned organic chemist who remained a friend and mentor to Shreeve the rest of his life. After earning the Humboldt Senior Scientist Award, she spent a sabbatical awardee year in Europe, lecturing and working at the University of Bristol and University of Göttingen, where she worked with Oskar Glemser

She has spent much of her career advocating for women chemists and research into fluorine chemistry, serving on a variety of committees for the American Chemical Society and American Association for the Advancement of Science. She has also been recognized for her teaching and mentorship to approximately 130 post-doctoral researchers. Throughout her career, Shreeve has published 663 scientific papers and earned one patent. She is known for working with highly energetic nitrogenous and fluoridated compounds, and created syntheses for a variety of widely used rocket propellant oxidizers.

Shreeve's work includes novel syntheses of chlorodifluoroamine and dinitrogen difluoride, precursors to rocket propellant oxidizers that were difficult to synthesize in usable quantities prior to her work. She is also recognized for her synthesis of fluorinated alkyl sulfoxides by controlled hydrolysis of bis(perfluoroalkyl) sulfur dioxides.

Honors and awards 

 National Science Foundation Fellow (1967-1968)
 Distinguished Alumni Award, University of Montana (1970)
 Alfred P. Sloan Fellow (1970-1972)
 Garvan-Olin Medal, American Chemical Society (1972)
 Honorable Alumna, University of Idaho (1972)
 National Director, Iota Sigma Pi (1972-1975)
 Senior U.S. Scientist Award, Alexander Von Humboldt Foundation (1978)
 Award for Creative Work in Fluorine Chemistry, American Chemical Society (1978)
 President, Idaho Academy of Science (1978-1979)
 College Chemistry Teaching Award, Manufacturing Chemists Association (1979)
 Fellow, AAAS (1980)
 Honorary Doctor of Science, University of Montana (1982)
 Board of Directors, American Chemical Society (1985-1991)
 Chair of Chemistry Section, AAAS (1989)
 Board of Directors, AAAS (1991-1995)
 Harry and Carol Mosher Award, Santa Clara Valley Section, American Chemical Society
 Idaho Hall of Fame (2001)
 Member, Royal Society of Chemistry

Editorships 
 Journal of Fluorine Chemistry (1970 - )
 Accounts of Chemical Research (1973-1975)
 Inorganic Synthesis (1976 - )
 Heteroatom Chemistry (1988 - )

Publications

References 

1933 births
21st-century American chemists
Living people
People from Deer Lodge, Montana